Bestelmeyer is a surname. Notable people with the surname include:

 Adolf Bestelmeyer (1875–1957), German physicist
 German Bestelmeyer (1874–1942), German architect

German-language surnames